Arthur Martin A'Beckett (1812 – 23 May 1871) was an English-born Australian surgeon and politician.

Life
A'Beckett was born in London to William A'Beckett, a solicitor, and Sarah Abbott. He attended London University and qualified as a medical practitioner. From 1835 to 1837, he was staff surgeon to the British Legion in Spain, where he received several Spanish decorations.

In 1838, A'Beckett married Emma Louise Elwin, with whom he had ten children. They migrated in that year to New South Wales, where practised successfully as a surgeon.

From 1856 to 1860, A'Beckett served on the New South Wales Legislative Council. His brother Sir William A'Beckett was Chief Justice of Victoria, while his son William Channing A'Beckett later joined the New South Wales Legislative Assembly.

Arthur A'Beckett died in Sydney in 1871.

Namesake
Arthur A'Beckett, lawyer, journalist and son of the writer Gilbert Abbott À Beckett, joined the staff of the magazine Punch in London in 1875. His first novel Fallen Among Thieves, "an early country house murder & detective story", had appeared in 1870.

References

1812 births
1871 deaths
Members of the New South Wales Legislative Council
19th-century Australian politicians